Zelentia is a genus of sea slugs, aeolid nudibranchs, marine gastropod molluscs in the family Trinchesiidae. 

Zelentia species feed on hydroids.

Species 
Species in the genus Zelentia include:
 Zelentia amoris Korshunova & Martynov, 2022
 Zelentia fulgens (MacFarland, 1966)
 Zelentia nepunicea Korshunova, Fletcher, Lundin, Picton & Martynov, 2018
 Zelentia ninel Korshunova, Martynov & Picton, 2017
 Zelentia pustulata (Alder & Hancock, 1854)
 Zelentia roginskae Korshunova, Fletcher, Lundin, Picton & Martynov, 2018
 Zelentia willowsi Korshunova, Fletcher, Lundin, Picton & Martynov, 2018

References

External links
 Korshunova, T.; Martynov, A.; Picton, B. (2017). Ontogeny as an important part of integrative taxonomy in tergipedid aeolidaceans (Gastropoda: Nudibranchia) with a description of a new genus and species from the Barents Sea. Zootaxa. 4324(1): 1

Trinchesiidae